Kunal Chandela (born 7 July 1994) is an Indian cricketer. He made his first-class debut for Delhi in the 2017–18 Ranji Trophy on 25 November 2017. He made his List A debut for Prime Bank Cricket Club in the 2017–18 Dhaka Premier Division Cricket League on 7 February 2018. He made his Twenty20 debut on 10 January 2021, for Uttarakhand in the 2020–21 Syed Mushtaq Ali Trophy.

References

External links
 

1994 births
Living people
Indian cricketers
Place of birth missing (living people)
Delhi cricketers
Prime Bank Cricket Club cricketers
Uttarakhand cricketers